Pueblo Nuevo is a quarter of the City of Temuco, Chile. It is located in the northeast of the city, and corresponds to a residential area, with fragments used as warehouses, workshops, and electrical and transportation infrastructure. Its population was established there in the 1950s, but only in 2000 it was officially defined by the Municipality of Temuco in its Plan de desarrollo comunal (Communal Development Plan). Then, in 2010, in its Diagnóstico sistémico territorial (Territorial Systemic Diagnosis), the Municipality of Temuco modified its limits, transferring part of the territory of the Downtown and Costanera del Cautín Macrosectors, in addition to Ñielol Hill southeastern slopes. A new Territorial Diagnosis returned, in 2014, its original borders, being its current bordering macrosectors Ñielol (west), Costanera del Cautín (east and southeast) and Downtown, (south and southeast).

Geography 

It is located in the northeastern area of the City of Temuco.

In 2014, when its limits were restored, it was left again with its initial .

Limits 

Currently, it is delimited by the urban limit of Temuco between the Cautín River and Rudecindo Ortega Avenue, and the imaginary straight line that joins the intersection of the northern access with that urban limit and point 23 of the border of the city (north); the imaginary straight line that joins point 23 with the crossing of Ñielol Alleyway and the public road projected as Orbital Street in the communal regulatory plan, Ñielol Alleyway, Callejuela and Vicente Pérez Rosales Streets, Gibbs Canal, and General Cruz Street (west); Tucapel Street (south); and Barros Arana Avenue and its extension from Holland Park to the urban limit of Temuco (east).

Bordering quarters 

Pueblo Nuevo borders the following quarters:

Demography

Town planning

Neighborhoods

Green areas 
 Bandejón Pinto.
 Country Club.

Transportation

Road arteries 

The road arteries of Pueblo Nuevo are:

Urban buses 

 Line 1A: Cajón-Altos de Maipo.
 Line 1B: Cajón-Labranza.
 Line 1C: Cajón-Labranza.
 Line 1D: Cajón-Amanecer.
 Line 2A: Road to Cajón-Santa Elena de Maipo.
 Line 2B: Road to Cajón-Labranza.
 Line 2C: Road to Cajón-Labranza.
 Line 2D: Road to Cajón-University of La Frontera.
 Line 4A: Road to Labranza-Vista Volcán.
 Line 4B: Road to Labranza-Cajón.
 Line 6A: Los Ríos Neighborhood-El Carmen.
 Line 6B: Los Ríos Neighborhood-Chivilcán.
 Line 6C: Los Ríos Neighborhood-Quepe.
 Line 7A: El Carmen-Cajón.
 Line 7B: El Carmen-San Juan Pablo II Campus.
 Line 9B: El Carmen-Parque Alcántara.
 Line 9C: Portal San Francisco-Los Trapiales.
 Line 9D: El Carmen-Los Trapiales.
 Line 66A: Pillanlelbún-Quepe.

Line 10A 

Until Monday, May 9, 2022, line 10A passed through Pueblo Nuevo and reached the San Juan Pablo II Campus of Temuco Catholic University, but the route was eliminated because, according to the company in charge of the tender, there was a lack of personnel to drive the buses.

Share taxis 

 Line 11P: Portal de La Frontera-Rodoviario de La Araucanía.
 Line 17: Pueblo Nuevo-Caupolicán Neighborhood.
 Line 17A: Pueblo Nuevo-El Carmen.
 Line 20: Chivilcán-Parque Costanera 2.
 Line 111 Altamira: Rodoviario de La Araucanía-Altamira.
 Line 111 Los Pablos: Rodoviario de La Araucanía-Los Pablos.
 Line 111 Pehuén: Rodoviario de La Arucanía-Parque Pehuén.

Metro 

The Chilean Chamber of Construction proposed, in 2010, to build a metropolitan railway in Greater Temuco, to solve the transportation problems that will be generated, in the medium term, by the increase in population in the conurbation. The stations proposed for Pueblo Nuevo Quarter are:

Line 1

Metrotren Araucanía 

Metrotren Araucanía is a railway project that, initially, would link the city of Temuco and the commune of Gorbea. The section between Temuco and Gorbea Stations was announced on September 3, 2019, by the Government of Chile, but on June 11, 2021, two stops were added to the route, located north of Temuco Station, on the limit of Pueblo Nuevo and Costanera del Cautín Quarters. These stations were:

The entry into operation of the first stage, between Vista Volcán and Padre Las Casas 2, had been planned for August 2022; however, in May 2022, the mayor of Padre Las Casas, Mario González, recognized that the project had been left deadlocked in the Ministry of Social Development, and that it had to start from scratch with money from the State Railway Company. This situation implied that, at that time, only two stations were considered on the route: Temuco and Padre Las Casas 2, with the construction of the rest of the previously announced stops being suspended, including those located on the border between Pueblo Nuevo and Costanera del Cautín.

Trade 

In Pueblo Nuevo, there is the Ñielol Gastronomic District, an initiative of different traditional Chilean food establishments, born in 2015. It is located near Ñielol Hill, with General Cruz, General Mackenna, Manuel Antonio Matta and Tucapel Streets, and Caupolicán Avenue as main road arteries.

Between 2010 and 2014, when the southern limit of the quarter reached Balmaceda Avenue, it owned a commercial area around Feria Pinto market, which is currently part of Temuco Downtown.

Education 
 Temuco Catholic University:
 Doctor Luis Rivas del Canto Campus.
 San Juan Pablo II Campus.
 Pueblo Nuevo Polytechnic High School.

Sports

Pueblo Nuevo Stadium 
Pueblo Nuevo Stadium is a sports venue that has a football pitch with synthetic grass, stands for the public, and dressing rooms, in addition to a court of rayuela, a national sport in Chile. There, sports competitions of various organizations and clubs are held, as well as workshops organized by the Municipality of Temuco. It is located on 2750, Cacique Lemunao Street.

Other sport venues 
 Ñielol Sports Field.

Arts

Security 

 Fifth Fire Station.

See also 

 Temuco.

References

External links 
 Pueblo Nuevo in OpenStreetMap.
 Pueblo Nuevo in Wikimapia.